Estadio Julian Javier is a multi-use stadium in San Francisco de Macorís, Dominican Republic.  It is currently used mostly for baseball games and hosts the home games of Gigantes del Cibao and Atlético San Francisco of the Dominican football league (LDF).  The stadium holds 12,000 people.

References

San Francisco de Macorís
Julian Javier
Buildings and structures in Duarte Province